Jeremy Hartley Sims (born 10 January 1966) is an Australian actor and director.

Career
Jeremy Sims was born in Perth, Western Australia in 1966, and was educated at Wesley College 1977–83.

His first appearance on the big screen was as 'boy on raft' in the 1980 movie Harlequin. He graduated in 1990 from the National Institute of Dramatic Art (NIDA) in Sydney, with a degree in Performing Arts (Acting). In 2015, Sims landed a supporting role in Ruben Guthrie.

He is remembered by many for his role as Alex Taylor in the television soap opera Chances (1991–1992).

Other television appearances include Wildside, Medivac, Farscape, Young Lions, Stingers, The Secret Life of Us, Fireflies and McLeod's Daughters. In 1999 he appeared in the made-for-television film Secret Men's Business. He also starred in Home and Away as in 2009 as David "Gardy" Gardiner.

Production company
In 1995, together with then girlfriend Kym Wilson, Sims formed the theatrical production company "Pork Chop Productions".<ref name="history">"Company History  ", Porkchop Productions",  2008, Retrieved 20 April 2010</ref> Pork Chop won a Drover's award in 2005 for their production of the play, "Last Cab To Darwin".

 Filmography 
As a director:
 Last Train to Freo, feature film released in 2006.
 Beneath Hill 60, as Jeremy Hartley Sims, released in April 2010.
 Last Cab to Darwin, released in 2014
 Wayne Feature documentary on Motorcycle World Champion, Wayne Gardner. Released 2018.
 Rams'', released in 2020.

Personal life
Sims first daughter, China McDonald was born in 2000. Sims was married to film director Samantha Lang. They have two daughters, Frederique and Evelyn Sims. Jeremy and his wife Tania Leimbach have a son, Leroy Sims, 5 years old.

References

External links
 

1966 births
AACTA Award winners
Australian film directors
Australian male television actors
Living people
People educated at Wesley College, Perth
National Institute of Dramatic Art alumni